Attorney may refer to:

 Lawyer
 Attorney at law, in some jurisdictions
 Attorney, one who has power of attorney
 The Attorney, a 2013 South Korean film

See also 

 Attorney general, the principal legal officer of (or advisor to) a government
 Attorney's fee, compensation for legal services 
 Attorney–client privilege
 Clusia rosea, Scotch attorney, a tropical and sub-tropical flowering plant species